Robinson is an unincorporated community in Harrison County, in the U.S. state of Kentucky.

History
A post office called Robinson was established in 1892, and remained in operation until 1982. Some say the community's name is a corruption of the name of James Robertson, while others believe it was named for John or Benjamin Robinson, early postmasters.

References

Unincorporated communities in Harrison County, Kentucky
Unincorporated communities in Kentucky